Bambara, also known as Bamana or Bamanankan, is a lingua franca and national language of Mali spoken by perhaps 15 million people, natively by 5 million Bambara people and about 10 million second-language users. It is estimated that about 80 percent of the population of Mali speak Bambara as a first or second language. It has a subject–object–verb clause structure and two lexical tones.

Classification
Bambara is a variety of a group of closely related languages called Manding, whose native speakers trace their cultural history to the medieval Mali Empire. Varieties of Manding are generally considered (among native speakers) to be mutually intelligible – dependent on exposure or familiarity with dialects between speakers – and spoken by 30 to 40 million people in the countries Burkina Faso, Senegal, Guinea-Bissau, Guinea, Liberia, Ivory Coast and the Gambia. Manding is part of the larger Mandé family of languages.

Geographical distribution
Bambara is spoken throughout Mali as a lingua franca. The language is most widely spoken in the areas east, south, and north of Bamako, where native speakers and/or those that identify as members of the Bambara ethnic group are most densely populated. These regions are also usually considered to be the historical geographical origin of Bambara people, particularly Ségou, after diverging from other Manding groups.

Dialects
The main dialect is Standard Bamara, which has significant influence from Maninkakan. Bambara has many local dialects: Kaarta, Tambacounda (west); Beledugu, Bananba, Mesekele (north); Jitumu, Jamaladugu, Segu (center); Cakadugu, Keleyadugu, Jalakadougu, Kurulamini, Banimɔncɛ, Cɛmala, Cɛndugu, Baninkɔ, Shɛndugu, Ganadugu (south); Kala, Kuruma, Saro, dialects to the northeast of Mopti (especially Bɔrɛ); Zegedugu, Bɛndugu, Bakɔkan, Jɔnka (southeast).,

Writing

Since 1967, Bambara has mostly been written in the Latin script, using some additional phonetic characters. The vowels are a, e, ɛ (formerly è), i, o, ɔ (formerly ò), u; accents can be used to indicate tonality. The former digraph ny is now written ɲ when it designates a palatal nasal glide; the ny spelling is kept for the combination of a nasal vowel with a subsequent oral palatal glide. Following the 1966 Bamako spelling conventions, a nasal velar glide "ŋ" is written as "ŋ", although in early publications it was often transcribed as ng or nk.

The N'Ko alphabet is a script devised by Solomana Kante in 1949 as a writing system for the Manding languages of West Africa; N’Ko means 'I say' in all Manding languages. Kante created N’Ko in response to what he felt were beliefs that Africans were a "cultureless people" since prior to this time there had been no indigenous African writing system for his language. N'ko first gained a strong user base around the Maninka-speaking area of Kante's hometown of Kankan, Guinea and disseminated from there into other Manding-speaking parts of West Africa. N'ko and the Arabic script are still in use for Bambara, although only the Latin-based orthography is officially recognized in Mali.

Additionally, a script known as Masaba or Ma-sa-ba  was developed for the language beginning in 1930 by Woyo Couloubayi (c.1910-1982) of Assatiémala.  Named for the first characters in Couloubayi's preferred collation order, Masaba is a syllabary which uses diacritics to indicate vowel qualities such as tone, length, and nasalization.  Though not conclusively related to other writing systems, Masaba appears to draw on traditional Bambara iconography and shares some similarities with the Vai syllabary of Liberia and with Arabic-derived secret alphabets used in Hodh (now Hodh El Gharbi and Hodh Ech Chargui Regions of Mauritania). As of 1978, Masaba was in limited use in several communities in Nioro Cercle for accounting, personal correspondence, and the recording of Muslim prayers; the script's current status and prevalence is unknown.

Latin orthography
It uses seven vowels a, e, ɛ, i, o, ɔ and u, each of which can be nasalized, pharyngealized and murmured, giving a total number of 21 vowels (the letters approximate their IPA equivalents). 
Writing with the Latin alphabet began during the French colonization, and the first orthography was introduced in 1967. Literacy is limited, especially in rural areas. Although written literature is only slowly evolving (due to the predominance of French as the "language of the educated"), there exists a wealth of oral literature, which is often tales of kings and heroes. This oral literature is mainly passed on by the griots (Jeliw in Bambara) who are a mixture of storytellers, praise singers, and human history books who have studied the trade of singing and reciting for many years. Many of their songs are very old and are said to date back to the old empire of Mali.

Alphabet
 A – a – [a]
 B – be – [b]
 C – ce – [t͡ʃ]
 D – de – [d]
 E – e – [e]
 Ɛ – ɛ – [ɛ]
 F – ef – [f]
 G – ge – [g]
 H – ha – [h]
 I – i – [i]
 J – je – [d͡ʒ]
 K – ka – [k]
 L – ɛl – [l]
 M – ɛm – [m]
 N – ɛn – [n]
 Ɲ – ɲe – [ɲ]
 Ŋ – ɛŋ – [ŋ]
 O – o – [o]
 Ɔ – ɔ – [ɔ]
 P – pe – [p]
 R – ɛr – [r]
 S – ɛs – [s]
 T – te – [t]
 U – u – [u]
 W – wa – [w]
 Y – ye – [j]
 Z – ze – [z]

Other letters
 kh – [ɣ] (used for loanwords from other African languages)
 -n – nasalises vowel
 sh – she – [ʃ] (regional variant of s)

N'ko orthography

Vowels
 ߊ – a – [a]
 ߋ – e – [e]
 ߌ – i – [i]
 ߍ – ɛ – [ɛ]
 ߎ – u – [u]
 ߏ – o – [o]
 ߐ – ɔ – [ɔ]

Consonants
 ߓ – ba – [b]
 ߔ – pa – [p]
 ߕ – ta – [t]
 ߖ – ja – [d͡ʒ]
 ߗ – ca – [t͡ʃ]
 ߘ – da – [d]
 ߚ/ߙ – ra – [r]
 ߛ – sa – [s]
 ߜ? – ga – [g/ʀ/ɣ]
 ߜ – gba – [ɡ͡b]
 ߝ – fa – [f]
 ߞ – ka – [k]
 ߟ – la – [l]
 ߡ – ma – [m]
 ߢ – nya or ɲa – [ɲ]
 ߒ – nga or ŋa – [ŋ]
 ߣ – na – [n]
 ߥ – wa – [w]
 ߦ – ya – [j]
 ߤ – ha – [h]
 ߲ – nasal vowel – [-̃]

Tones
 ߫ – short high
 ߬ – short low
 ߯ – long high
 ߰ – long low

Phonology

Consonants 

Each consonant represents a single sound with some exceptions:
 "W" is pronounced as in English (e.g. wait) except at the end of a word, when it is the plural mark and is pronounced as [u].
 "S" is pronounced most often as in the English word "see" but is sometimes pronounced as "sh" [ʃ] as in the word "shoe" or as [z].
 "G" is pronounced most often as in the English word "go" but in the middle of a word, it can be pronounced as in the Spanish word "abogado" ([ɣ]) and sometimes at the beginning of a word as [gw].

Vowels

Grammar
Bambara is an agglutinative language, meaning that morphemes are glued together to form a word.

The basic sentence structure is subject-object-verb (SOV).  Take the phrase, n t'a lon (I don't know [it]). n is the subject (I), a is the object (it), and [ta] lon is the verb ([to] know). The t'  is from the negative present tense marker té, bé being the affirmative present tense marker (n b'a don would mean "I know it"). Like many SOV languages, Bambara uses postpositions rather than prepositions - their role being similar to English prepositions but placed after the noun.

The language has two (mid/standard and high) tones; e.g. sa 'die' vs. sá 'snake.' The typical argument structure of the language consists of a subject, followed by an aspectival auxiliary, followed by the direct object, and finally a transitive verb.  

Bambara does not inflect for gender. Gender for a noun can be specified by adding an adjective, -cɛ or -kɛ for male and -muso for female. The plural is formed by attaching a vocalic suffix -u, most often with a low tone (in the orthography, -w) to nouns or adjectives.

Loan words
In urban areas, many Bamanankan conjunctions have been replaced in everyday use by French borrowings that often mark code-switches. The Bamako dialect makes use of sentences like: N taara Kita mais il n'y avait personne là-bas. : I went to Kita [Bamanankan ] but there was no one there [French]. The sentence in Bamanankan alone would be Ń taara Kita nka mɔkɔ si tun tɛ yen. The French proposition "est-ce que" is also used in Bamanankan ; however, it is pronounced more slowly and as three syllables, .

Bamanankan uses many French loan words. For example, some people might say:
I ka kurusi ye jauni ye: "Your skirt is yellow" (using a derivation of the French word for yellow, jaune.)

However, one could also say:
I ka kulosi ye nɛrɛmukuman ye, also meaning "your skirt is yellow." The original Bamanankan word for yellow comes from "nɛrɛmuku," being flour (muku) made from néré (locust bean), a seed from a long seed pod. Nɛrɛmuku is often used in sauces in Southern Mali.

Most French loan words are suffixed with the sound 'i'; this is particularly common when using French words which have a meaning not traditionally found in Mali. For example, the Bamanankan word for snow is niegei, based on the French word for snow neige. As there has never been snow in Mali, there was no unique word in Bamanankan to describe it.

Examples

Music
Malian artists such as Oumou Sangaré, Sidiki Diabaté, Fatoumata Diawara, Rokia Traoré, Ali Farka Touré, Habib Koité and the married duo Amadou & Mariam often sing in Bambara. Lyrics in Bambara occur on Stevie Wonder's Journey Through "The Secret Life of Plants".

Additionally, in 2010, Spanish rock group Dover released its 7th studio album I Ka Kené with the majority of lyrics in the language. American rapper Nas also released a track titled "Sabali" in 2010, which featured Damian Marley. Sabali is a Bambara word that means patience.

Legal status
Bambara is one of several languages designated by Mali as a national language.

References

Citation

Sources

 Bailleul Ch. Dictionnaire Bambara-Français. 3e édition corrigée. Bamako : Donniya, 2007, 476 p.
 Bird, Charles, Hutchison, John & Kanté, Mamadou (1976) An Ka Bamanankan Kalan: Beginning Bambara. Bloomington: Indiana Univ. Linguistics Club.
 Bird, Charles & Kanté, Mamadou (1977) Bambara-English, English-Bambara student lexicon. Bloomington: Indiana Univ. Linguistics Club.
 Dumestre Gérard. Grammaire fondamentale du bambara. Paris : Karthala, 2003.
 Dumestre, Gérard. Dictionnaire bambara-français suivi d’un index abrégé français-bambara. Paris : Karthala, 2011. p. 1189
 Eidelberg, Joseph "Bambara (A PROTO-HEBREW LANGUAGE?)"
 Kastenholz, Raimund (1998) Grundkurs Bambara (Manding) mit Texten (second revised edition) (Afrikawissenschaftliche Lehrbücher Vol. 1). Köln: Rüdiger Köppe.
 Konaré, Demba (1998) Je parle bien bamanan. Bamako: Jamana.
 Morales, José (2010) J'apprends le bambara. 61 conversations, (book + CD-ROM).  Paris: Editions Karthala. 
 Touré, Mohamed & Leucht, Melanie (1996) Bambara Lesebuch: Originaltexte mit deutscher und französischer Übersetzung = Chrestomathie Bambara: textes originaux Bambara avec traductions allemandes et françaises (with illustrations by Melanie Leucht) (Afrikawissenschaftliche Lehrbücher Vol. 11) . Köln: Rüdiger Köppe.

External links

Descriptions
 Mali – History – Language

Dictionaries
 Maliyiri.com is a website which provides English-Bambara-French translations and is a community-based project where users can add new words, comments, provide feedback and follow one another.
 Corpus Bambara de Référence - Etiquetage online and downloadable Bambara-French Dictionary (about 11,500 entries by the end of 2014), with a French-Bambara index, linked with the Corpus Bambara de Référence
 An ka taa's Mobile-friendly Bambara-English dictionary that includes French and Jula.
 Bambara entries (>2300) in the French Wiktionary
 Bambara-French-English dictionary online and downloadable lexicons for language learners
 Bambara tree names (scientific name -> common name)

Learning materials
 Online Bambara Course from the Indiana University
   on peacecorps.gov

Other
 Corpus Bambara de Référence Corpus Bambara de Référence, an electronic corpus of Bambara texts (about 2,000,000 words end 2014)
 Maliyiri.com's Android application, with thousands of daily users, provides English-Bambara-French translations and users can choose to get daily/weekly word notifications for continuous learning.
 Bambara Electronic Library, AMALAN – LLACAN
 An ka taa: a website with a dictionary, resources and media for learning Bambara and Manding more generally.
 Bambara at French Wikibooks contains more material
 Mandenkan Journal
 PanAfriL10n page on Manding (includes information on Bambara)
 Maneno in Bambara (a blogging platform with a full Bambara interface)

 
Languages of Burkina Faso
Languages of Ghana
Languages of Guinea
Languages of Ivory Coast
Languages of Mali
Languages of Senegal
 languages of the Gambia
 languages of Mauritania
 languages of Niger
Manding languages
Subject–object–verb languages